Declan Thomas Rudd (born 16 January 1991) is an English former professional footballer who played as a goalkeeper.

Early life
Born in Diss, Norfolk, he was originally spotted by Norwich City when playing for local side Bressingham as a striker.

"I think my size helped me," said Rudd speaking to Club's official matchday programme, 'On The Ball', back in October 2007. "I was quite tall for my age and I've always enjoyed playing in goal in the past. But the coaches at my old club always felt I was better outfield. It was only at Norwich when they said I wouldn't make it as a striker that I became a goalkeeper."

Club career

Norwich City
As a youth player, Rudd was heavily involved with Norwich's run in the FA Youth Cup in 2008–09. In the fifth round, he saved three penalties against Everton, having also scored a penalty in an earlier round. Norwich manager Bryan Gunn said:
It's all in Declan's hands, literally, but then again it's in his feet as well. He showed the confidence he's got as a young goalkeeper. He stood up and took the winning penalty kick against Stoke – last night he just saved the three. I'm sure he'll be in there with a big smile on his face today and rightly so. He's got an opportunity to be a top quality goalkeeper. He's just got to be focused on his job ahead and not get rushed into things. We have to try and develop him in the right way. When he comes into the first team training he doesn't look out of place. He's got a great opportunity of being a top class goalkeeper.

Rudd was named as a substitute for the final game of the 2007–08 season at Hillsborough against Sheffield Wednesday.

In summer 2008, Rudd signed a professional contract with the Canaries. In season 2008–09, he was allocated a squad number of 13.

He made his professional debut on 26 September 2009, in an away match at Gillingham, coming on as a substitute following the sending off of Fraser Forster. His full debut came three days later at Carrow Road in a 4–0 win against Leyton Orient.

Rudd made his first appearance in the Championship in a 2–1 victory over Barnsley on 11 September 2010, due to an injury to John Ruddy.

Rudd made his first appearance in the Premier League on 27 August 2011, after John Ruddy was sent off in a 3–1 defeat to Chelsea. His first taste of Premier League football was to concede a penalty from Frank Lampard. Due to Ruddy's subsequent suspension, Rudd made his full Premier League debut on 11 September at home to West Bromwich Albion, saving a penalty from Peter Odemwingie in a 1–0 defeat.

Following Norwich's 4–1 FA Cup victory over Burnley in January 2012, Rudd was ruled out for a few months with a thigh injury sustained in training.

On 12 August 2014, following two loan spells at Preston North End, Rudd signed a new three-year contract at Norwich, with the option for a further twelve months.

Preston North End 
It was announced on 20 June 2017 that Rudd had signed a permanent deal with Preston North End for an undisclosed fee.

On 31 March 2022, Rudd announced his retirement from football due to a knee injury.

International career
Rudd played for England at various youth levels. He gained his first Under-21 call up in August 2011.

Career statistics

Honours
Norwich City
Football League Championship play-offs: 2015

England U19
UEFA European Under-19 Championship runner-up: 2009

References

External links

1991 births
Living people
People from Diss, Norfolk
Sportspeople from Norfolk
English footballers
England youth international footballers
England under-21 international footballers
Association football goalkeepers
Norwich City F.C. players
Preston North End F.C. players
Charlton Athletic F.C. players
English Football League players
Premier League players